The Central Military District (Russian: Центральный военный округ) is a military district of Russia.

It is one of the five military districts of the Russian Armed Forces, with its jurisdiction primarily within the central Volga, Ural and Siberia regions of the country and Russian bases in Central Asian post-Soviet states. The Central Military District was created as part of the 2008 military reforms, and founded by Presidential Decree No.1144 signed on September 20, 2010, as an amalgamation of the Volga–Urals Military District and a majority of the Siberian Military District. The district began operation on October 21, 2010, under the command of Lieutenant-General Vladimir Chirkin.

The district contains 29 of the 85 federal subjects of Russia: Altai Krai, Altai Republic, Bashkortostan, Chelyabinsk Oblast, Chuvashia, Irkutsk Oblast, Kemerovo Oblast, Khakassia, Khanty-Mansi Autonomous Okrug, Kirov Oblast, Krasnoyarsk Krai, Kurgan Oblast, Mari El, Mordovia, Yamalo-Nenets Autonomous Okrug, Novosibirsk Oblast, Omsk Oblast, Orenburg Oblast, Penza Oblast, Perm Krai, Samara Oblast, Saratov Oblast, Sverdlovsk Oblast, Tatarstan, Tomsk Oblast, Tuva, Tyumen Oblast, Udmurtia, Ulyanovsk Oblast.

The Central Military District is headquartered in Yekaterinburg, and its current district commander is Lieutenant-General Andrey Mordvichev, who has held the position since 17 February 2023.

History
It was reported that a new mountain motorised rifle brigade, the 55th, would be formed in Kyzyl, Tyva Republic, in 2015. The brigade was formed in November 2015.

In June 2015, Leslie H. Gelb wrote that the role of the Central Military District is to "orchestrate Russian engagement in local conflicts within Central Asia, to manage Russia’s bases in Tajikistan and Kyrgyzstan, and to supply reinforcements from its two armies either to the east or the west in the event of war" and that their purpose is to "forestall instability that might spill over into Russia and to remind everyone that Russia’s Armed Forces are mightier than China’s".

In February 2019, there were Russian-language reports that the Central Military District (as well as the Western Military District) were to be divided, to leave a military district organisation more like the pre-2010 situation.

After the signing of the 2020 Nagorno-Karabakh ceasefire agreement on 9 November 2020, the Russian Defense Ministry announced that Russian peacekeepers would be deployed to Nagorno-Karabakh the following day for monitoring the cease-fire and the cessation of military actions in the Nagorno-Karabakh conflict zone. The contingent will consist of 1,960 servicemen, 90 armored vehicles, 380 units of vehicles and special equipment mainly formed of units of the 15th Separate Motor Rifle Brigade of the Central Military District.

Component units 
The following list is mostly sourced from milkavkaz, 2017.

Ground forces 
 2nd Guards Combined Arms Army (Samara)
 41st Combined Arms Army (Novosibirsk)
 90th Guards Tank Division (Chebarkul)
 201st Military Base (Dushanbe, Tajikistan)
 232nd Rocket Artillery Brigade (Chebarkul) (see :ru:232-я реактивная артиллерийская бригада)
 28th Anti-Aircraft Missile Brigade (Chebarkul)
 59th Command Brigade (Verkhnyaya Pyshma)
 179th Signal Brigade (Yekaterinburg)
 12th Separate Guards Engineer Brigade (Ufa)
 15th Separate Motor Rifle Peacekeeping Brigade (Roshchinsky, Samara Oblast)
 18th Separate Electronic Warfare Brigade (Yekaterinburg)
 1st Mobile NBC Protection Brigade (Shikhany)
 29th Separate NBC Protection Brigade (Yekaterinburg)
 179th Communications Brigade (Yekaterinburg)
 5th Separate Railway Brigade (Abakan)
 43rd Separate Railway Brigade (Yekaterinburg)
 48th Separate Railway Brigade (Omsk)
 105th Separate Logistics Support Brigade (Kryazh)
 106th Separate Logistics Support Brigade (Yurga)
 24th Separate Repair and Recovery Regiment (Karabash)
 473rd District Training Center (Yelansky, Sverdlovsk Oblast)

 1311 Central Base for Storage and Repair of Weapons and Military Equipment (TsBHiRT) (Military Unit Number 42716, Verkhnyaya Pyshma), former Volga-Urals Military District; -  415 tanks are relatively combat-ready (of which 289 are being preserved under dry air)
 3018 Central Tank Reserve Base (military unit 75485, 624852, Kamyshlov, Sverdlovsk Oblast)

Main Directorate of General Staff 
 3rd Guards Special Purpose Brigade (Tolyatti)
 24th Special Purpose Brigade (Novosibirsk)
 39th Separate Special Purpose Radio-Technical Brigade (Orenburg)

Airborne troops 
 31st Guards Airborne Brigade (Ulyanovsk)

Air Force 
 14th Air and Air Defence Forces Army (Yekaterinburg)

Joint-service ceremonial units 
 Military Band of the Central Military District (Yekaterinburg)
 Honour Guard of the Central Military District
 Song and Dance Ensemble of the Central Military District

Leadership

Commanders
 Lieutenant-General Vladimir Chirkin (9 July – 13 December 2010 (acting), 13 December 2010 – 26 April 2012)
 Colonel-General Valery Gerasimov (26 April – 9 November 2012)
 Major-General Aleksandr Dvornikov (9 November – 24 December 2012 (interim)).
 Colonel-General Nikolay Bogdanovsky (24 December 2012 – 12 June 2014)
 Colonel-General Vladimir Zarudnitsky (12 June 2014 – 22 November 2017)
 Lieutenant-General Aleksandr Lapin (22 November 2017 – 29 October 2022) (later Colonel General)
 Major-General Aleksandr Linkov (29 October 2022 – 17 February 2023 (acting)) 
 Lieutenant-General Andrey Mordvichev (17 February 2023 – present)

Chiefs of Staff - First Deputy Commanders
 Lieutenant General Mikhail Teplinsky (February 2019 – June 2022) (Colonel General since 8 December 2021)

Deputy commanders
 Deputy commander 
 Lieutenant General Yevgeny Poplavsky (November 2018 – present)
 Deputy commander for Military-Political Work and Head of the Department for Military-Political Work
 Major General Rustam Minnekaev (December 2020 – present)

See also
 List of military airbases in Russia

References

Citations

Bibliography 
 

Military districts of the Russian Federation
Military units and formations established in 2010
2010 establishments in Russia